Alexander Anatolyevich Potkin (born 29 April 1976), also known as Alexander Belov, is a Russian nationalist politician.

Political career
Potkin led the Movement Against Illegal Immigration, a nationalist organization, which was later banned in April 2011. The following month, he co-founded the nationalist organization "Russians" with Dmitry Demushkin, which was later banned in 2015.

Criminal cases
In May 2009, he was found guilty by a Moscow Court of inciting ethnic hatred after comparing the Russian White House to a Torah Scroll.

In August 2016, he was sentenced to prison on charges of creating an extremist group and money laundering. He was sentenced to seven and a half years in prison.

References

External links 
 Lentapedia article (in Russian)

1976 births
Anti-Caucasus sentiment in Russia
Anti–Central Asian sentiment in Russia
Antisemitism in Russia
Critics of Islam
Living people
Politicians from Moscow
Russian nationalists
Russian State University for the Humanities alumni